KVWC is a Full Service formatted broadcast radio station.  The station is licensed to Vernon, Texas and serves Wilbarger County, Wichita Falls, and Childress in Texas and Altus in Oklahoma.  KVWC is owned by High Plains Radio Network and operated under their HPRN Network, LLC licensee.

References

External links
 AM 1490 KVWC Online
 

1939 establishments in Texas
Full service radio stations in the United States
Radio stations established in 1939
VWC